Time to Pretend is the second EP by the American rock band MGMT, released on August 30, 2005 by Cantora Records and made available on iTunes. New versions of the tracks "Time to Pretend" and "Kids" were later released on MGMT's debut album Oracular Spectacular (2007–2008). At the time this was recorded they were still known as "The Management".

Will Griggs (member of the Cantora Records team) contacted David Perlick Molinari from French Horn Rebellion, for the production of this EP.

On October 1, 2015, MGMT announced on social media that the EP would be re-released on vinyl as part of Record Store Day on November 27, 2015.

Track listing

Quotes
"MGMT finally forayed with their first single, 'Time to Pretend' -- an understated anthem among inhabitants of Athens." – Julia Norman (Spin.com)

References

2005 EPs
MGMT albums